Emmanuel Eboa Lotin August 6, 1942 - October 6, 1997 was a Cameroonian musical artist, creating music based on the style of Makossa, native to his home country.

Early life 
Lotin was born in the city of Douala, in Cameroon. His father was Adolph Lotin Same, a Baptist pastor, who died when Eboa was 3. When he was a young child, his leg was paralyzed due to atrophy resulting from a quinine injection.

In 1962, Lotin recorded his first single "Mulema Mwam, Elimba Dikalo". Lotin was regarded as a major figure in the Makossa musical genre.

Lotin died on October 6, 1997.

References 

1942 births
1997 deaths
Cameroonian musicians
People from Douala